BNO may refer to:
 British National (Overseas)
 British National (Overseas) passport
 Baksan Neutrino Observatory
 BNO News, a news agency 
 Boys Night Out (band), an emo/post-hardcore band from Burlington, Ontario, Canada.
 Burns Municipal Airport in Burns, Oregon, which have FAA identifier BNO
 The Beano comic
 Building network operator – in the UK the party responsible for pre-meter electrical distribution within a multi-occupancy building
 Bowels not open, i.e. constipation